Ficus punctata  is a lesser-known climbing liana reported from Myanmar, the Andaman-Nicobar Archipelago, Thailand, Indochina, Malaysia, and Indonesia  with remarkable ornamental value. It is a handsome woody liana with spectacular spotted orange fruits. This taxon occurs in disturbed forests and rarely along the edges of the evergreen forests. This species has remarkable ornamental value and can be introduced in gardens. This Ficus can be identified in the field by its climbing habit, presence of milky latex, rhomboidal obovate coriaceious leaves, and beautiful spotted crimson-orange fruits.

References

punctata